Tupinambis longilineus, the Rhondonia tegu, is a species of lizard in the family Teiidae. It is endemic to Brazil.

References

Tupinambis
Reptiles described in 1995
Taxa named by Teresa C.S. Ávila-Pires